Farmhouse ale is an ancient European tradition where farmers brewed beer for consumption on the farm from their own grain. Most farmers would brew for Christmas and/or the late summer work, but in areas where they had enough grain farmers would use beer as the everyday drink.

Farmhouse ale has enormous variation in the ingredients and brewing process used, both of which follow ancient local traditions.

Today many microbreweries make beers they market as farmhouse ale, but in most cases the connection with the actual farmhouse brewing tradition is rather tenuous. 

In Finland, Estonia, and Lithuania, however, there are commercial farmhouse breweries that brew on the farm according to the ancient traditions. Some of these still have the original farmhouse yeast.

In Belgium and Northern France there are breweries making beers that are thought to derive from beers traditionally brewed on the farms in these areas, but the connection is not well documented, and it's not clear how close the commercial beers are to the farmhouse-brewed originals.

History
Farmers have been brewing beer from their own grain since long before the beginning of recorded history, so the beginnings of farmhouse brewing are not documented at all.  Originally, farmhouse ale was brewed all over Europe, but in classical antiquity wine-growing largely displaced beer brewing in southern Europe. In northern Europe farmhouse brewing was gradually reduced by taxation and modernization, but in many countries it never quite died out.

Over the last decade there has been a resurgence of interest in farmhouse brewing, partly driven by interest in the unique brewing methods and ingredients still in use. One example is the recent adoption of kveik yeast in modern brewing.

Varieties

Many countries have their own variant:
 Norway: Several styles collectively known as maltøl
 Belgium: Saison and Grisette
 Finland: Sahti, Kotikalja
 France: Bière de Garde
 Sweden: Gotlandsdricka
 Denmark: landøl.
 Estonia: koduõlu
 Latvia: miezītis.
 Lithuania: kaimiškas, 
 Russia: derevenskoye pivo, literally, 'rustic beer'.

Further reading

 Garshol, Lars Marius. (2020). Historical Brewing Techniques: The Lost Art of Farmhouse Brewing. Boulder: Brewers Publications.
 Laitinen, Mika.  (2019). Viking Age Brew: The Craft of Brewing Sahti Farmhouse Ale. Chicago: Chicago Review Press.
 Markowski, Phil. (2004). Farmhouse Ales: Culture and Craftsmanship in the Belgian Tradition. Boulder: Brewers Publications.
 Nordland, Odd. (1969). Brewing and beer traditions in Norway: The social anthropological background of the brewing industry. Oslo: Universitetsforlaget.
 Räsänen, Matti. (1975). Vom Halm zum Fass: Die volkstümlichen Alkoholarmen Getreidegetränke in Finnland. Helsinki: Suomen Muinaismuistoyhdistys.

References 

Types of beer